In mathematics, a rod group is a three-dimensional line group whose point group is one of the axial crystallographic point groups. This constraint means that the point group must be the symmetry of some three-dimensional lattice.

Table of the 75 rod groups, organized by crystal system or lattice type, and by their point groups:

The double entries are for orientation variants of a group relative to the perpendicular-directions lattice.

Among these groups, there are 8 enantiomorphic pairs.

See also 

 Point group
 Crystallographic point group
 Space group
 Line group
 Frieze group
 Layer group

References

External links 
 "Subperiodic Groups: Layer, Rod and Frieze Groups" on Bilbao Crystallographic Server
 Nomenclature, Symbols and Classification of the Subperiodic Groups, V. Kopsky and D. B. Litvin

Euclidean symmetries
Discrete groups